Kurt Aepli (born 14 May 1914 in Rapperswil, St. Gallen, Switzerland; died 22 December 2002 in Uznach, St. Gallen) was a Swiss silversmith, a designer of fine jewelry and implements, as well as a professional educator.

Life
Aepli completed his education as a silversmith at the School of Applied Arts (today, the Berufschule für Gestaltung) in Zurich between 1934 and 1939. Due to the mobilization of the Swiss military during World War II, he went straight on to four years of active duty. In 1942, he took the position of head  designer in the studio of Meinrad Burch-Korrodi, and before long he developed the signature style by which both the jewelry and particularly the ecclesiastical implements he designed can be recognized. He left his mark as a trailblazer of Christian sacral art in Switzerland during the second half of the 20th century, about the same time as the church builder and designer Fritz Metzger and the painter Ferdinand Gehr, both of whom he held in high esteem. It is hardly coincidental that Aepli's creative output peaked during the period of expectation that was associated with the Second Ecumenical Council of the Vatican, 1962 to 1965. There is little doubt that the economic boom following the Second Eorld War had been good for the jewelry trade, because when Christoph Trudel took over the business from Meinrad Burch in 1967, Aepli was so soundly established that the creative freedom granted by Trudel Juwelier was practically without limit. Between 1946 and 1980, Aepli was a member of the Swiss Work Federation (Schweizerischer Werkbund, or SWB), an association dedicated to the debate of creative issues and the development of design. Like so many successful creative minds of the 1930s, the Zurich School of Concrete and Constructive Art made a profound impression. Artists like Johannes Itten, Max Bill and Richard P. Lohse, but also the Bauhaus were each of most apparent influence throughout Aepli's entire career.

Creative output
The success of the companies Burch-Korrodi and Trudel Juwelier was due in large part to the professional-technical know-how and the creative contribution of Aepli. In the studio of Meinrad Burch, the almost legendary "goldsmith-triumvirate", as it was referred to locally in the trade, eventually developed. It consisted of Aepli (chief designer), Martin Bucher (chef d’atelier) and Berger Bergersen (master enameler), all three of whom were professionally and technically equally adept, complemented one another's respective fields of expertise and wored famously as a team.

Aepli's style might best be described as the evolution of Modernism, the Bauhaus and Art Déco. Using a scientific approach, compositions methodically evolved from the basic geometric shapes, using nothing but flat, square or round stock. Yet a close observation of nature and its creations led him to conclude that there were no incorrect forms, colors or sounds in nature, which is recognizable throughout his decade-long creative activity.

This dynamic was maximized by the inclusive application of high-value materials. Lines, forms and shapes were pared down to their essence in a sure-footed manner that was as consistent as it was calculating. As a consequence, these pieces required the most exacting standards of execution. Jewelry, frequently using unusual gemstones, and ecclesiastical implements were created by him, both at Burch-Korrodi, as well as later at Trudel Juwelier. Besides designing, Aepli frequently carried out the silversmithing jobs himself.

Although the clientele consisted mainly of aficionados and collectors, the name of Kurt Aepli was little known to the general public. For decades, his oeuvre was shrouded under the studio of Burch-Korrodi. Although this manner of prescribed anonymity bothered him, his unmistakable style left its mark on goldsmiths and silversmiths, reaching far beyond the German-speaking part of Switzerland, particularly north of the Alps. He set new standards for the creation of jewelry and implements.

Educational career
1945 Kurt Aepli was elected a specialist subject teacher to the School of Arts in Zurich, which remained under the direction of Johannes Itten until 1954. He taught goldsmiths, silversmiths, chasers, engravers, metal spinners, gemstone setters, designers and metal polishers. All student apprentices in the school district of Zurich from these professions learned their respective trade theory, gemology and rendering from him. Besides teaching compulsory trade curricula, Aepli also taught continuing education night classes at the School of Arts in Zurich, providing tradespeople with an opportunity to further their skills in silversmith techniques. Here too, Aepli's creative abilities were greatly appreciated by students, leaving their mark on many of them. He retired from his 35-year career as an educator at the School of Arts in Zurich in April 1980.

Exhibitions
Swiss National Museum, Zürich: Swiss Jewelry in the 20th Century (Schweizerschmuck im 20. Jahrhundert)

Notes

Further reading
Antoinette Riklin-Schelbert: 20th Century Swiss Art Jewelry–Schmuckzeichnen Schweiz 20. Jahrhundert
Schweizerische St. Lukasgesellschaft: Sakrale Kunst–Gold- und Silberarbeiten aus der Werkstatt Meinrad Burch-Korrodi
Karl Iten: Aufbruch zur neuen Form – Der Goldschmied Meinrad Burch-Korrodi 1897–1978 und seine Werkstatt
Graham Hughes: Modern Silver Throughout the World 1880–1967
Dr. Ulla Stöver: Email, Kunst aus dem Feuer
Ernst A. and Jean Heiniger: The Great Book of Jewels
Peter Widmer: A Legacy of Creativity, translation by Robert Ackermann and Robert Kilborn (Professional Jeweler, July 2004)

External links

 Personal and professional profile of Kurt Aepli with images at the Berufschule für Gestaltung, Zürich
 Berufschule für Gestaltung, Zürich
 Professional Jeweler Magazine, July 2004
 The Ganoksin Project: excerpt Swiss Jewelry Design in the 20th Century; from GZ Art + Design - issue 2, spring 2004
 JCK Online.com New Design Finds, April 1, 1996
 Neue Zürcher Zeitung, January 3, 2003
 Schmuckszene Zürich, by Susan Sagherian, July 1998
 Silberschatz der Schweiz: Gold- und Silberschmiedekunst aus dem Schweizer Landesmuseum, by Hanspeter Lanz
 Swiss National Museum Zurich

1914 births
2002 deaths
Goldsmiths
Swiss jewelry designers
Swiss designers
Swiss educators
Swiss jewellers
Swiss silversmiths
People from Rapperswil-Jona